Aristidis Louvaris (1913–9 January 2009) was a Greek footballer who played as a goalkeeper.

Club career

Louvaris started football when he joined AEK Athens at the age of 18. He played at the club for four years, until 1935. There he won the first Greek Cup in 1932. However, he was in the shadow of the legendary goalkeeper, Giorgos Giamalis and thus he was transferred to Theseus Piraeus. He played there from 1936 until the start of the World War II, in 1941.

Afterwards, he joined Olympiacos, thereby making the big dream of his life come true. He took over from the then great international goalkeeper, Achilleas Grammatikopoulos. But since the events of the War and the Occupation occurred, Louvaris spent the greatest and most fruitful period of his career being inactive, as all of the Greek football at the time. Despite all this, he trained with his teammates at the risk of his life, on the courts of Kaisariani, Piraeus and Kokkinia. His  passion for football that held inside him for five years, broke out at the end of 1944, after the liberation of Greece. When football started to restore, Louvaris played as the permanent goalkeeper, not only for Olympiacos, but also for the Greek national and military team. After making his best appearances in 1946, the Romanian champion, Venus requested his transfer, but the company of petroleum in which Louvaris was working did not allow him to leave Greece. With Olympiacos won 2 consecutive Panhellenic Championships, 1 Cup and 4 consecutive Piraeus FCA Championships, including a domestic double in 1947. until his retirement in 1949.

International career
Louvaris appeared 5 times an with the Greece and the military team, playing in the first post-war matches.

Personal life
Louvaris lived in Marousi until he died on 13 January 2009. His son, Giorgos was the A' vice-president at Olympiacos for years.

Honours

AEK Athens
Greek Cup: 1931–32

Olympiacos
Panhellenic Championship: 1946–47, 1947–48
Greek Cup: 1938–39, 1946–47
Piraeus FCA League: 1946, 1947, 1948, 1949

References

1913 births
2009 deaths
Greek footballers
Association football goalkeepers
Footballers from Piraeus
AEK Athens F.C. players
Olympiacos F.C. players